John Souther (March 1, 1816 – September 12, 1911) was the founder of Globe Locomotive Works, an American steam locomotive manufacturing company.  In his obituary published in the Newton, Massachusetts, Town Crier, he is credited with designing the pattern for the fence around Boston Common.  In 1852 he built the first Tunnel Boring machine using Charles Wilson's Patented design (Nos. 14,483 and 17,650).  The machine was tried at the Hoosac Tunnel work but after only 12 feet the steel was not up to the test of grinding rock.

In 1854 Souther would build two 4-4-0 locomotives for the Fitchburg Railroad, the Hoosac and the Champion.  He also built two 25-horsepower steam shovel for Norman Carmine Munson to use in filling the Boston Back Bay.

On his death in 1911, he was survived by a son and a daughter. Souther attended the funeral on May 4, 1870 of Zerah Colburn, the well-known locomotive engineer and journalist, who for a time (circa 1853) was employed by Souther.

References

American Railway Times 4, no. 19 (6 May 1852): Souther's Works at South Boston. American Railway Times 4, no. 43 (21 October 1852): machine shop in South Boston. American Railway Times 5, no. 5 (3 February 1853: machine was commenced at South Boston in the month of December 1851. Weekly Transcript 10, no. 2 (1852), 2: “Globe Works, South Boston.” Souther's business, located on Foundry Street, was known as the Globe Works and Globe Locomotive Works.

1816 births
1911 deaths
19th-century American inventors
American railroad mechanical engineers
American people in rail transportation
19th-century American businesspeople